Tanay Hemant Chheda (born 27 June 1996) is an Indian actor who appeared in Hindi films. He is best known for his child performances in the critically acclaimed films Taare Zameen Par (2007) and Slumdog Millionaire (2008), with the latter earning him the Screen Actors Guild Award for Outstanding Performance by a Cast in a Motion Picture and a nomination for Best Ensemble at the Black Reel Awards of 2008.

Early life
Chheda was born on 27 June 1996 and is a Gujarati Jain with roots in Mundra, Kutch who was born in Mumbai, Maharashtra, where he currently lives. He attended the Choate Rosemary Hall in Wallingford, Connecticut, United States.

Career
He was first seen in the movie Don: The Chase Begins Again in 2006. He has the critically acclaimed Taare Zameen Par (Like Stars on Earth) in 2007 to his name and the award-sweeping Slumdog Millionaire in 2008.

In Don, he played the role of Deepu, the son of Jasjit (played by Arjun Rampal). In Taare Zameen Par, he played the role of Rajan, a disabled child who is an extremely helpful and supportive friend to the protagonist Ishaan (played by Darsheel Safary). In Slumdog Millionaire, Chheda played the role of Teenage Jamal, in adolescence, for which he has won the Screen Actors Guild Award for Outstanding Performance by a Cast in a Motion Picture and received a nomination for Best Ensemble at the Black Reel Awards of 2008. He was also seen as Junior Rizwan in Karan Johar's My Name Is Khan (2010). His last appearance in a feature length film was in a German film Hexe Lilli- Journey to Mandolan in 2011.

Filmography

References

External links
 

Living people
21st-century Indian male child actors
Indian male film actors
Outstanding Performance by a Cast in a Motion Picture Screen Actors Guild Award winners
21st-century Indian male actors
Gujarati people
Kutchi people
Male actors from Mumbai
1996 births